Telford Homes is a housebuilding company that specialises in developments in non-prime areas of London.

In April 2018 it was reported that Telford Homes was expecting record profits and revenues for the financial year 2017/18 as a result of London’s shortage of housing.

In October 2019 Telford Homes was acquired by CBRE Group's real estate development subsidiary Trammell Crow Company in a £267 million deal.

References

External links 

Home builders